Anthony William James "Tony" Lundon (born 13 April 1979) is an Irish singer, dancer, cinematographer, director, producer, writer, presenter plus actor. He is best known as a member of the pop group Liberty X.

Liberty X enjoyed success worldwide, before splitting up in 2006. After Liberty X split, Lundon presented a quiz series called TOAST on The Den on RTÉ Two on Saturday mornings and also produced and promoted an Irish music and sport live event series in London known as The Big Shindigs. In 2010 he moved to New York City to study film and returned to the UK in 2012 to establish a film, TV and music production company, The Cell Productions. With the Cell, Lundon produced and directed a short film for The Scout Association which has become their most watched worldwide and has since aired across the Discovery Channel channels in the UK.

Liberty X reformed in 2012 for the ITV2 series The Big Reunion, followed by a one-off performance at the Hammersmith Apollo alongside other pop acts such as Five, Atomic Kitten and B*Witched. Due to the success of the show, Liberty X and the other acts from the show embarked on an arena tour around the UK and Ireland, followed by a "Christmas party" tour in December 2013.

Singing career

2001: Popstars
Lundon was born in Galway. In 2001, he auditioned for the ITV reality television talent competition Popstars, a show intended to form a new group from individual contestants. Lundon made it down to the final ten, alongside Danny Foster, Michelle Heaton, Myleene Klass, Kym Marsh, Suzanne Shaw, Kevin Simm, Noel Sullivan, Jessica Taylor and Kelli Young. Ultimately, Foster, Klass, Marsh, Shaw and Sullivan were chosen to be in the group Hear'Say, and Lundon, Heaton, Taylor, Simm and Young were dubbed "Flopstars" by the media.

2001–2006: Liberty X
While the five winning contestants of Popstars formed Hear'Say, the five runner-up contestants formed the group Liberty. The name Liberty was chosen to reflect the freedom the members experienced following their participation in Popstars. Amidst pejorative media commentary (including the term "Flopstars"), the act proceeded to sign a multimillion-pound record contract with Richard Branson's independent record label, V2 records. Shortly after forming, Liberty received a legal challenge in the UK High Court from a funk R&B band, also called "Liberty", who achieved success in the 1990s, including being awarded Capital Radio Band of the Year, playing at Wembley Arena, touring around Europe and the release of albums in the UK, the US and Europe. The original Liberty claimed that the newly formed Liberty was taking advantage of the goodwill that had been created by the former's success (known in English law as the "tort of passing off"). The final judgment was in favour of the funk R&B band and the ex-Popstars then asked readers of UK tabloid newspaper, The Sun to suggest a new name. The winning name was "X Liberty", but the group used the entry as the basis for the official title, "Liberty X".

Liberty X enjoyed seven Top 10 singles from 2001 to 2005. Their biggest hit, "Just a Little", reached number one in May 2002. "Thinking It Over", "Got to Have Your Love", "Song 4 Lovers", and "Holding on for You" all reached the top 5 in the UK Singles Chart. Their debut album, Thinking It Over, reached number three in the UK Albums Chart June 2002. Liberty X released another 2 albums, Being Somebody and X, which reached number 12 and number 27, respectively. Liberty X won two Brit Awards: for Best British Single and Best British Breakthrough Artist. They split up in 2006 after selling over 3 million records worldwide.

2006–2012: Solo projects
After Liberty X split, Lundon presented a quiz series called TOAST on The Den on RTÉ Two on Saturday mornings and also produced and promoted an Irish music and sport live event series in London known as The Big Shindigs. In 2010 he moved to New York City to study film and returned to the UK in 2012 to establish a film, TV and music production company, The Cell Productions. With the Cell, Lundon produced and directed a short film for The Scout Association which has become their most watched worldwide and has since aired across the Discovery Network channels in the UK.

2012–present: Comeback with Liberty X, The Big Reunion and touring
On 18 October 2012, it was announced that Liberty X, along with five other pop groups of their time – B*Witched, Honeyz, 911, Five and Atomic Kitten – would reunite for an ITV2 series called The Big Reunion, in which they would reveal about their individual stories about their life in the band before reforming for a gig at the Hammersmith Apollo, singing their greatest hits. The show, which aired from 31 January to 28 March 2013, followed the groups rehearsing for two weeks ahead of one major comeback performance at the London Hammersmith Apollo on 26 February.

On 29 January, the group revealed on their official Twitter account that they would be interviewed for the first time in over five years as a band on Lorraine on 31 January.

Tickets for the Hammersmith Apollo reunion gig went on sale shortly after the premiere of the first episode of The Big Reunion and sold out in less than five minutes. Due to this, it was confirmed that a full UK tour was in the works, later confirmed again by Heaton on her Twitter account. On 11 February, it was confirmed that, due to high demands for tickets and the popularity of the show, an arena tour around the UK would be taking place from 3–12 May 2013. On 27 March 2013 it was announced that the bands would perform a mini Christmas tour in December 2013.

On 29 March 2013, Heaton confirmed that Liberty X would yet again disband following the concerts, saying: "We talked about it, and we thought we've got so many children between us and quite a few things individually going on that we didn't want the pressure to be successful again. We just wanted to have fun. I know some of the other bands are planning to release new material but Liberty X, we are not planning to do that. We are just enjoying it for what it is. We're going to enjoy the gigs, all the performing and have fun and not take it too seriously – and know at the end, we go back to being mums and dads to our children. That's how it's different." Liberty X performed their final gig together on 15 December 2013.

Personal life
Tony married his long-term girlfriend Kelly Ann Leatham in December 2010 at Ballintubber Abbey in County Mayo. They have three children – Leo, born in April 2012, and twins Rioghan and Max, born in February 2013. Kelly Ann went into labour with Rioghan and Max during rehearsals for The Big Reunion concert at the Hammersmith Apollo. Tony missed some rehearsal time due to this, but made it back for the concert. He is the great grand nephew of William Lundon and the grand nephew of Thomas Lundon.

Filmography

Actor and presenter

Cinematographer, director and producer

See also
 List of Galway people

References

External links
 

Irish pop singers
Irish male singers
People from Galway (city)
People from County Galway
1979 births
Liberty X
Living people
Performers of Irish dance
Irish male dancers